Space Capital LP is an early-stage venture capital firm that invests exclusively in space-based technologies. Formed in 2016, and based in New York City, Space Capital is the parent brand of Space Angels, an online angel investment platform, and Space Talent, a career platform and central node for space industry jobs.

History
Space Capital was founded by Chad Anderson in 2017 in New York City, with Tom Ingersoll joining as a Partner. Space Capital launched its first fund of $16 million in 2017.

Space Capital began publishing a quarterly update on space startup and investment activity in 2017, which coined the 2010s as the entrepreneurial space age. The report has been cited by the United States Secretary of Commerce and by the Vice President of the United States at the sixth meeting of the National Space Council.

On March 18, 2020, Space Capital and SIlicon Valley Bank published a report called “The GPS Playbook”, which forecasted emerging opportunities for investors in three high-growth fields over the coming decade: GPS, geospatial intelligence and space-based communications. The report predicted GPS will see new commercial growth and applications through the convergence of space-based signals and computer vision. It also predicted space-based communications and geospatial intelligence could generate $1 trillion of equity value over the next decade.

On May 5, 2020, Space Capital formalized its brand architecture with Space Capital as the parent brand and Space Angels, an online angel investment platform, and Space Talent, a career platform and central node for space industry jobs, as its sub-brands.

Investments
Space Capital invests globally in private companies. It specializes in early stage investments in the Space economy and is specifically focused on unlocking the value in Space technology stacks such as GPS, Geospatial Intelligence, and Communications.

See also
Private equity
Venture capital

References

External links
Space Capital website

Venture capital firms of the United States
Financial services companies based in New York City
Financial services companies established in 2017
2017 establishments in New York City
Privately held companies based in New York City